El cuerpo del deseo (literally: The Body of Desire), is a Spanish-language telenovela produced by Telemundo and filmed in Florida. This limited-run series is about a man who comes back from the dead and discovers dark secrets about his beautiful widow. The first version of El cuerpo del deseo was En cuerpo ajeno, produced by RTI Colombia in 1992. In India, the show was broadcast on Firangi in Hindi as Second Chance. In Pakistan, the show was broadcast on Urdu 1 with Urdu dub as Isabel – Meri Akhri Mohabbat. In the Philippines, the show was broadcast on ABS-CBN in Filipino as El Cuerpo from March 24 to November 14, 2008.

Plot
The story features Pedro José Donoso (Andrés García), a wealthy old man who lives in a big mansion with his daughter Angela and his servants. He falls in love with and marries a gorgeous younger woman, Isabel Arroyo (Lorena Rojas). He dies suddenly, and Isabel marries employee Andres Corona. But Pedro Jose Donoso returns to Earth through transmigration: (the passing of a soul into another body after death), in the body of Salvador Cerinza (Mario Cimarro), a handsome (yet poor) family man. Salvador was actually a poor man who lived with his wife Cantalicia and son Moncho, but Pedro's soul forced Salvador's soul to leave Salvador's body, although Salvador hadn't died.

Pedro José searches for everything he lost, uncovering secrets, truths and deceptions. Ultimately, he must set things straight and save those who truly loved him, and reclaim the heart of beautiful Isabel. Pedro changes his name to Salvador and enters his mansion as a poor driver. Isabel feels attracted and falls in love with him. Both have sex several times and secretly Isabel kills Andres and marries Salvador. Angela marries Antonio, the maid Abigail's son. Antonio and Angela love each other very much. Pedro thinks that his death was not natural. He believes that Isabel killed him by giving him poison. Isabel did not give him poison in truth. When Isabel discovers that Salvador is Pedro, she asks him to forgive her and tells him the truth. Pedro and Isabel reunite and leave the mansion without informing anyone. However, Isabel's Aunt, Miss Rebecca believes that Salvador might have taken Isabel somewhere so that he can kill her and grab her wealth, so she and the butler, Walter, inform the police. The police chase Pedro and Isabel. Isabel tells Pedro that she doesn't want to be separated from him again, so she drives the car into a river.

Isabel dies, so Pedro's soul also leaves his body. Both souls live together and rest in peace forever. Then, the real Salvador's soul enters Salvador's body again. Isabel is buried with Pedro, and Salvador lives in Pedro's mansion for six months, but keeps on irritating everyone. Everyone finds out the truth about Pedro's transmigration and everyone is happy that finally Isabel and Pedro have reunited, but they want to get rid of the real Salvador as he was very dirty. Finally, they find Cantalicia and Moncho, and leave Salvador with him. Salvador becomes very happy. Also, Angela gives birth to a son whom they name Don Pedro.

Cast

Main 
 Andrés García as Don Pedro José Donoso
 Mario Cimarro as Salvador Cerinza / Pedro José Donoso. Main protagonist.
 Lorena Rojas as Isabel Macedo Arroyo. Main Protagonist. Villain at first, later repents
 Martín Karpan as Andrés Corona. Villain, lover of Isabel. Hates Salvador and Pedro Jose. Attempted Isabel to poison his husband. Killed by Isabel
 Vanessa Villela as Ángela Donoso

Recurring 
 Anna Silvetti as Abigail Domínguez
 Erick Elías as Antonio Domínguez
 Pablo Azar as Simón Domínguez
 Roberto Moll as Walter Franco. Butler at the Donoso family. Hates Salvador. Villain.
 Jeannette Lehr as Gaetana Charry
 Martha Picanes as Rebecca Macedo. Villain. Aunt of Isabel, materialistic and manipulative woman
 Diana Osorio as Valeria Guzmán Macedo
 Yadira Santana as Virginiana de la Santacruz / Vicky
 Rosalinda Rodriguez as Cantalicia Muñeton
 Eduardo Serrano as Felipe Madero
 Emanuel Castillo as Salvador Alonso 'Moncho' Cerinza
 Sabrina Olmedo as Matilda Serrano
 Arianna Coltellacci as Consuelo Guerrero
 Sonia Noemí as Pilar
 Michelle Jones as Paola Jiménez
 Carmen Olivares as Fatima
 Silvestre Ramos as Camilo

Guest 
 Alcira Gil as Doña Lilia
 Anthony Álvarez as Ramon
 Félix Loreto as Doctor Duarte
 Lis Coleandro as Nina Macedo de Arroyo. Isabel's mother, villain. Dies

References

External links 
 

American television series based on telenovelas
Telemundo telenovelas
Television series by Universal Television
2005 telenovelas
2006 telenovelas
2005 American television series debuts
2006 American television series endings
Spanish-language American telenovelas
2005 Colombian television series debuts
2006 Colombian television series endings
American television series based on Colombian television series